The Masked Singer Japan is a Japanese reality singing competition show that is based on the South Korean television series King of Mask Singer. The series premiered on September 3, 2021, on Amazon Prime Video in Japan. The show features celebrities singing popular songs while wearing head-to-toe costumes and face masks concealing their identities. It employs panelists who guess the celebrities' identities by interpreting clues provided to them throughout the series.

Overview

Production 
In May 2021, it was announced that Amazon had greenlit an order for The Masked Singer to be produced and air on Amazon Prime Video Japan as an exclusive on that site. The show was confirmed to be streamed in September 2021 after being filming completed in February 2021. In-show narration is provided by voice actor, Subaru Kimura.

Panelists and host 
TV personality Yo Oizumi was announced as the main host of the program, while the announced panelists consist of Japanese girl group Perfume, guitarist Miyavi, model Kiko Mizuhara and comedian Bakarhythm. Guest panelists included actor Kazuya Kojima for the third and fourth episodes, comedian Hiroaki Ogi for the fifth and sixth episodes, and comedian Hidetsugu Shibata for the seventh and eighth episodes.

Series overview

Season 1

Episodes

Week 1 (September 3)

Week 2 (September 10)

Week 3 (September 17)
 Group number: "Joyful" by Ikimonogakari

Week 4 (September 24)
 Group number: "Memeshikute" by Golden Bomber

Week 5 (October 1)

Week 6 (October 8) - Semifinal

Week 7 (October 15) - Finale

 Group number: "One Night Carnival" by Kishidan

Season 2

Week 1 (August 4)

Week 2 (August 11)

 Group Performance: "Love Machine" by Morning Musume

Week 3 (August 18)
 Group Performance: "Zenroyku Shounen" by Sukima Switch

Week 4 (August 25)

 Group Performance: "La La La Love Song" by Toshinobu Kubota

Notes

References

Japanese reality television series
Japanese music television series
2021 Japanese television series debuts
Japanese television series based on South Korean television series
Masked Singer
Television shows filmed in Japan
Amazon Prime Video original programming